Fabiana imbricata, or pichi, is a species of flowering plant in the family Solanaceae, native to dry upland slopes in Chile and Argentina. It has needle-like leaves and small white, tubular flowers in early summer.

The upright form F. imbricata f. violacea, of horticultural origin, bears masses of pale violet flowers. It has gained the Royal Horticultural Society's Award of Garden Merit.

Description
Fabiana imbricata is a long-lived shrub distributed via seeds, and broadly distributed within South America. Fire and wind, followed by post-fire high precipitation in the early spring are requirements for successful F. imbricata shrub requirement. Furthermore, F. imbricata is a keystone species within these ecosystems, reducing species richness while simultaneously increasing fuel load during grassland colonization events, altering the structure of the surrounding ecosystem.

Uses
F. imbricata foliage has traditionally been employed as a diuretic and digestive, and has been proven to have a dose-dependent gastroprotective effect, in studies evaluating the main sesquiterpene of the foliage. Interest in F. imbricata has extended into the development of in vitro culturing of the plant’s tissue for the harvesting of secondary metabolites for further research.

Taxonomy
Fabiana imbricata is the type species for the genus Fabiana.

A recent analysis of the family Solanaceae by Olmstead and Migid, which included 89 genera and 190 species, including F. imbricata as a representative of the genus Fabiana. This study employed two chloroplast DNA regions (ndhF and trnLF) to provide higher resolution than previous analyses through the development of both a strict consensus based tree, and a most parsimonious tree, illustrating inferred branch lengths. Their analysis placed F. imbricata in the same position in both trees. In both, F. imbricata is a sister clade with Calibrachoa parviflora (68% BS in the strict consensus based tree). These genera together are sisters to Petunia axillaris (100% BS in the strict consensus based tree). This group together is within the supergeneric group Petunieae, within the family Solanaceae.

This analysis was limited to examining one species per each of these three genera, due to its breadth. 
These data are in agreement with the karyotypic analysis of Acosta, et al., which examined 41 populations of 5 genera (21 species) within the Nicotianeae tribe of Solanaceae (later reorganized by into several new groups, including the supergeneric group Petunieae by Olmstead and Migid, el at 2008).  This study found 2n=2x=18 (x=9) for F. imbricata, F. densa, and F. denudata, Calibrachoa sp. as well as Petunia species examine. They hypothesize x=7 to have been the basal number for Solanales, and the x=12 to have derived from the tetraploid level, followed by tetraploid reduction. Within the groups surveyed, this methodology does not give rise to the same phylogenetic tree overall as that of Olmstead and Migid, but for Fabiana and sister genera, it is in agreement. While the agreement of the two chloroplast analyses with the karyotyic analysis is valuable, current data does not permit the detailed phylogenetic analysis of Fabiana below the genus level.

References

External links

 Plants for a Future entry

Petunioideae
Flora of Chile